Microbacterium sediminis is a Gram-positive, rod-shaped, aerobic, psychrotolerant, thermotolerant, halotolerant, alkalitolerant bacterium from the genus Microbacterium which has been isolated from deep-sea sediments from the Indian Ocean.

References

Further reading

External links
Type strain of Microbacterium sediminis at BacDive -  the Bacterial Diversity Metadatabase	

Bacteria described in 2013
sediminis
Psychrophiles